Bengt Lager (born 13 June 1951) is a Swedish modern pentathlete. He competed at the 1976 Summer Olympics, finishing in 24th place in the individual event.

References

External links
 

1951 births
Living people
Swedish male modern pentathletes
Olympic modern pentathletes of Sweden
Modern pentathletes at the 1976 Summer Olympics
Sportspeople from Stockholm